Euglena is a genus of single cell flagellate eukaryotes. Species of Euglena are found in fresh water and salt water. They are often abundant in quiet inland waters where they may bloom in numbers sufficient to color the surface of ponds and ditches green (E. viridis) or red (E. sanguinea).

The species Euglena gracilis has been used extensively in the laboratory as a model organism.

Most species of Euglena have photosynthesizing chloroplasts within the body of the cell, which enable them to feed by autotrophy, like plants. However, they can also take nourishment heterotrophically, like animals. Since Euglena have features of both animals and plants, early taxonomists, working within the Linnaean two-kingdom system of biological classification, found them difficult to classify. It was the question of where to put such "unclassifiable" creatures that prompted Ernst Haeckel to add a third living kingdom (a fourth kingdom in toto) to the Animale, Vegetabile (and Lapideum meaning Mineral) of Linnaeus: the Kingdom Protista.

Form and function
When feeding as a heterotroph, Euglena takes in nutrients by osmotrophy, and can survive without light on a diet of organic matter, such as beef extract, peptone, acetate, ethanol or carbohydrates. When there is sufficient sunlight for it to feed by phototrophy, it uses chloroplasts containing the pigments chlorophyll a and chlorophyll b to produce sugars by photosynthesis. Euglena's chloroplasts are surrounded by three membranes, while those of plants and the green algae (among which earlier taxonomists often placed Euglena) have only two membranes. This fact has been taken as morphological evidence that Euglena's chloroplasts evolved from a eukaryotic green alga. Thus, the similarities between Euglena and plants would have arisen not because of kinship but because of a secondary endosymbiosis. Molecular phylogenetic analysis has lent support to this hypothesis, and it is now generally accepted.

Euglena chloroplasts contain pyrenoids, used in the synthesis of paramylon, a form of starch energy storage enabling Euglena to survive periods of light deprivation. The presence of pyrenoids is used as an identifying feature of the genus, separating it from other euglenoids, such as Lepocinclis and Phacus.

Euglena have two flagella rooted in basal bodies located in a small reservoir at the front of the cell. Typically, one flagellum is very short, and does not protrude from the cell, while the other is long enough to be seen with light microscopy. In some species, such as Euglena mutabilis, both flagella are "non-emergent"--entirely confined to the interior of the cell's reservoir--and consequently cannot be seen in the light microscope.  In species that possess a long, emergent flagellum, it may be used to help the organism swim. The surface of the flagellum is coated with about 30,000 extremely fine filaments called mastigonemes.

Like other euglenoids, Euglena possess a red eyespot, an organelle composed of carotenoid pigment granules. The red spot itself is not thought to be photosensitive. Rather, it filters the sunlight that falls on a light-detecting structure at the base of the flagellum (a swelling, known as the paraflagellar body), allowing only certain wavelengths of light to reach it. As the cell rotates with respect to the light source, the eyespot partially blocks the source, permitting the Euglena to find the light and move toward it (a process known as phototaxis).

Euglena lacks a cell wall. Instead, it has a pellicle made up of a protein layer supported by a substructure of microtubules, arranged in strips spiraling around the cell. The action of these pellicle strips sliding over one another, known as metaboly, gives Euglena its exceptional flexibility and contractility. The mechanism of this euglenoid movement is not understood, but its molecular basis may be similar to that of amoeboid movement.

In low moisture conditions, or when food is scarce, Euglena forms a protective wall around itself and lies dormant as a resting cyst until environmental conditions improve.

Reproduction
Euglena reproduce asexually through binary fission, a form of cell division.  Reproduction begins with the mitosis of the cell nucleus, followed by the division of the cell itself.  Euglena divide longitudinally,  beginning at the front end of the cell, with the duplication of flagellar processes, gullet and stigma.  Presently, a cleavage forms in the anterior, and a V-shaped bifurcation gradually moves toward the posterior, until the two halves are entirely separated.

Reports of sexual conjugation are rare, and have not been substantiated.

Historical background and early classification

Species of Euglena were among the first protists to be seen under the microscope.

In 1674, in a letter to the Royal Society, the Dutch pioneer of microscopy Antoni van Leeuwenhoek wrote that he had collected water samples from an inland lake, in which he found "animalcules" that were "green in the middle, and before and behind white." Clifford Dobell regards it as "almost certain" that these were Euglena viridis, whose "peculiar arrangement of chromatophores...gives the flagellate this appearance at low magnification."

Twenty-two years later, John Harris published a brief series of "Microscopical Observations" reporting that he had examined "a small Drop of the Green Surface of some Puddle-Water" and found it to be "altogether composed of Animals of several Shapes and Magnitudes." Among them, were "oval creatures whose middle part was of a Grass Green, but each end Clear and Transparent," which "would contract and dilate themselves, tumble over and over many times together, and then shoot away like Fish."

In 1786, O.F. Müller gave a more complete description of the organism, which he named Cercaria viridis, noting its distinctive color and changeable body shape. Müller also provided a series of illustrations, accurately depicting the undulating, contractile movements (metaboly) of Euglena'''s body.

In 1830, C. G. Ehrenberg renamed Müller's Cercaria Euglena viridis, and placed it, in keeping with the short-lived system of classification he invented, among the Polygastrica in the family Astasiaea: multi-stomached creatures with no alimentary canal, variable body shape but no pseudopods or lorica. By making use of the newly invented achromatic microscope, Ehrenberg was able to see Euglena's eyespot, which he correctly identified as a "rudimentary eye" (although he reasoned, wrongly, that this meant the creature also had a nervous system).  This feature was incorporated into Ehrenberg's name for the new genus, constructed from the Greek roots "eu-" (well, good) and glēnē (eyeball, socket of joint).

Ehrenberg did not notice Euglenas flagella, however. The first to publish a record of this feature was Félix Dujardin, who added "filament flagelliforme" to the descriptive criteria of the genus in 1841. Subsequently, the class Flagellata (Cohn, 1853) was created for creatures, like Euglena, possessing one or more flagella. While "Flagellata" has fallen from use as a taxon, the notion of using flagella as a phylogenetic criterion remains vigorous.

Recent phylogeny and classification

In 1881, Georg Klebs made a primary taxonomic distinction between green and colorless flagellate organisms, separating photosynthetic from heterotrophic euglenoids. The latter (largely colorless, shape-changing uniflagellates) were divided among the Astasiaceae and the Peranemaceae, while flexible green euglenoids were generally assigned to the genus Euglena.

As early as 1935, it was recognized that this was an artificial grouping, however convenient. In 1948, Pringsheim affirmed that the distinction between green and colorless flagellates had no taxonomic justification, although he acknowledged its practical appeal. He proposed something of a compromise, placing colorless, saprotrophic euglenoids in the genus Astasia, while allowing some colorless euglenoids to share a genus with their photosynthesizing cousins, provided they had structural features that proved common ancestry. Among the green euglenoids themselves, Pringsheim recognized the close kinship of some species of Phacus and Lepocinclis with some species of Euglena.

The idea of classifying the euglenoids by their manner of nourishment was finally abandoned in the 1950s, when A. Hollande published a major revision of the phylum, grouping organisms by shared structural features, such as the number and type of flagella. If any doubt remained, it was dispelled in 1994, when genetic analysis of the non-photosynthesizing euglenoid Astasia longa confirmed that this organism retains sequences of DNA inherited from an ancestor that must have had functioning chloroplasts.

In 1997, a morphological and molecular study of the Euglenozoa put Euglena gracilis in close kinship with the species Khawkinea quartana, with Peranema trichophorum basal to both. Two years later, a molecular analysis showed that E. gracilis was, in fact, more closely related to Astasia longa than to certain other species recognized as Euglena. In 2015, Dr Ellis O'Neill and Professor Rob Field have sequenced the transcriptome of Euglena gracilis, which provides information about all of the genes that the organism is actively using. They found that Euglena gracilis has a whole host of new, unclassified genes which can make new forms of carbohydrates and natural products.

The venerable Euglena viridis was found to be genetically closer to Khawkinea quartana than to the other species of Euglena studied. 
Recognizing the polyphyletic nature of the genus Euglena, Marin et al. (2003) have revised it to include certain members traditionally placed in Astasia and Khawkinea.

Human consumption
The taste of powdered euglena is described as dried sardine flakes, and contains minerals, vitamins and docosahexaenoic, an omega-3 acid. The powder is used as ingredient in other foods. Kemin Industries sells a euglena nutraceutical supplement ingredient featuring dried Euglena gracilis with high levels of beta glucan.

Feedstock for biofuel production
The lipid content of Euglena'' (mainly wax esters) is seen as a promising feedstock for production of biodiesel and jet fuel. Under the aegis of Itochu, a start-up company called Euglena Co., Ltd. has completed a refinery plant in Yokohama in 2018, with a production capacity of 125 kiloliters of bio jet fuel and biodiesel per year.

Video gallery

See also
 Elysia chlorotica
 Kleptoplasty

References

External links

The Euglenoid Project
Tree of Life web project: Euglenida
Protist Images: Euglena
Euglena at Droplet - Microscopy of the Protozoa
Images and taxonomy

Euglenozoa genera
Articles containing video clips
Taxa named by Christian Gottfried Ehrenberg